The Third Solution (also known as Russicum) is a 1988 Italian crime-thriller film written and directed  by Pasquale Squitieri and starring Treat Williams.

Plot

Cast

 Treat Williams as Mark Hendrix 
 F. Murray Abraham as Father Carafa
 Danny Aiello as George Sherman
 Rita Rusic as Alexandra
 Robert Balchus as Michael Wessling
 Rossano Brazzi as Marini
 Nigel Court as Father Hanema
 Leopoldo Mastelloni as Father Isidoro 
 Luigi Montini
 Rada Rassimov
 María Baxa
 Franco Diogene
 Lorenzo Piani

References

External links

Films directed by Pasquale Squitieri
1980s crime thriller films
English-language Italian films
1980s English-language films
1980s Italian films